Loabeega Aniyaa is a 1997 Maldivian drama film directed by Ahmed Shimau. Produced by Hussain Rasheed under Farivaa Films, the film stars Mariyam Nisha, Hussain Sobah, Jamsheedha Ahmed and Hamid Ali in pivotal roles.

Plot
Sofa (Mariyam Nisha) an established actress decides to go on a vacation to an inhabited island for five days, where she meets Ahammaidhee (Hussain Sobah) an underprivileged talented vocalist. The duo spends most of the days hanging out with each other and exploring the island along with Ahamma's younger sister Mariyam (Jamsheedha Ahmed). Two weeks later, Sofa's father came to the island to take her back to Male'. She gives her Male' address to them and invites Ahamma and Mariyam to their house. She discloses her love for Ahamma, in front of her father and her producer Niyaz (Hamid Ali), who is secretly in love with her. Outraged, Niyaz announced that he is ready to go extreme extent to win Sofa's love and trust.

After convincing Ahamma's potential, Niyaz agreed to launch his career as an actor through his studio. Ahamma changed his name to Soba and his films received widespread acclaim. Niyaz, envious of Soba's achievements, decided to destroys Soba's career. On their wedding day, Soba unexpectedly meets with an accident, planned out by Niyaz. Besides some minor fractures, it was revealed that Soba will not be able to speak afterwards. Soba's role in the upcoming films and stage shows were replaced with other actors and Sofa asks for a break from acting to spend more time with Soba. Niyaz sends some goons to Sofa's house where one of them murders Sofa's father and Soba's presence in the crime scene forced Sofa to believe that the murderer is Soba. Empathizing for Soba, Sofa refused to hand him over to police. They later discovers Niyaz's involvement in Sofa's father's murder and is jailed.

Cast 
 Mariyam Nisha as Sofa
 Hussain Sobah as Ahammaidhee / Soba
 Hamid Ali as Niyaz
 Chilhiya Moosa Manik as Sofa's father
 Jamsheedha Ahmed as Mariyam
 Ajwad as Aju
 Sithi Fulhu as Sithi Fulhu
 Suneetha Ali as maid
 Shakir
 Mohamed Fairooz as Ali

Soundtrack

References

1997 films
Maldivian drama films
Films directed by Amjad Ibrahim
1997 drama films
Dhivehi-language films